A handbook is a type of reference work, or other collection of instructions, that is intended to provide ready reference. The term originally applied to a small or portable book containing information useful for its owner, but the Oxford English Dictionary defines the current sense as "any book ...  giving information such as facts on a particular subject, guidance in some art or occupation, instructions for operating a machine, or information for tourists."  

A handbook is sometimes referred to as a vade mecum (Latin, "go with me") or pocket reference. It may also be referred to as an enchiridion.

Handbooks may deal with any topic, and are generally compendiums of information in a particular field or about a particular technique. They are designed to be easily consulted and provide quick answers in a certain area. For example, the MLA Handbook for Writers of Research Papers is a reference for how to cite works in MLA style, among other things. Examples of engineering handbooks include Perry's Chemical Engineers' Handbook, Marks' Standard Handbook for Mechanical Engineers, and the CRC Handbook of Chemistry and Physics.

See also
Guidebook
Manual (disambiguation)
Oxford Companions
Abramowitz and Stegun Handbook of Mathematical Functions
CRC Handbook of Chemistry and Physics
Mathematical tables
MAOL, a Finnish handbook for science
BINAS, a Dutch science handbook

Notes

External links 

Vademecum in opus Saxonis et alia opera Danica compendium ex indice verborum - a Medieval Latin dictionary

 
Reference works